Qiu Jianliang is a Chinese kickboxer. He joined the Chinese National Muay Thai Team in September 2012. In October 2013 he joined the Da Dong Xiang fight club to compete in professional kickboxing.

As of December 2021, he is ranked as the fifth best super featherweight in the world by Combat Press, and was ranked as high as #1 in February 2021.

Career

Early career
Jianliang made his professional debut against Wisrichai at the 2013 China vs Thailand Muay Thai tournament. He beat Wisrichai by a second-round knockout. Twelve months later, he beat Songchai by knockout as well. He suffered his first professional loss against Phosa Nopphorn on January 18, 2014.

On May 24, 2014 in Xinyang Stadium at Yokkao 9 Qiu Jianliang beat Imwiset Pornnarai.

On November 1, 2014, Jianliang fought Melsik Baghdasaryan at Wu Lin Feng & WCK Muaythai: China vs USA for the Wu Lin Feng International 67 kg title. Baghdasaryan won the fight by majority decision.

Jianliang came in overweight for a fight against Hiroki Kangeki scheduled on April 12, 2015. He was cancelled and Jainliang given an automatic loss.

On July 4, 2015, Jianliang took part in the 2015 WLF 67 kg tournament. After winning a unanimous decision against Andrei Kulebin in the semifinals, he lost a unanimous decision in turn to Yang Zhuo. He rebounded from this loss with a decision win against Andrei Khamionak.

The 14-fight winning streak
His victory over Khamionak was the first win of a six fight winning streak, during which he further beat Kane Conlan and Shavone Warren by decision, as well as Alessio Dangelo, Bovy Sor Udomson and Mosab Amrani by stoppage. This fight culminated in a fight with Honghoen Por.niramon for the S1 Muaythai Welterweight title. Jianliang won the fight by a third-round knockout.

Jianliang participated in the 2016 Wu Lin Feng World Championship, held in Shanghai. He beat Nathan Robson and Lu Jianbo in the quarterfinals and semifinals respectively. He fought a rematch with Andrei Kulebin in the finals, and won by a first-round knockout.

On April 2, 2016 in China at the inaugural Glory of Heroes event Qiu Jianliang beat Jomthong Chuwattana.
 On May 7, 2016 in Shenzhen, China at Baoan Stadium on Glory of Heroes 2, Qiu Jianliang beat Noppakrit Kor.Kampanart. After beating Ruslan Kushnirenko at Glory of Heroes 3, he Jianliang was scheduled to fight Azize Hlali at Wu Lin Feng 2016: China vs Morocco. Hlali won the fight by decision, snapping Jianliang's 14-fight winning streak.

Glory of Heroes title run
September 17, 2016 in Chaoyang, China on a new event series dubbed "Rise of Heroes" Qiu Jianliang defeated Melvin Wassing. On Saturday, October 1, 2016 Glory of Heroes 5 in Zhengzhou, Qiu Jianliang beat Ilias Bulaid by decision. At Rise of Heroes 4, Jianliang fought Sebastien Fleury for the Martigny M.J.M Champion 67 kg title. He won the fight by a first-round head kick knockout.

After this title win, Jianliang beat Adrian Maxim at Glory of Heroes 5 by unanimous decision.
On January 13, 2017 Qiu Jianliang was in action at Glory of Heroes 6, where he earned a violent, spinning back kick finish of Kem Sitsongpeenong, to climb into the second place in Combat Press' rankings. On March 4, 2017 Glory of Heroes debuted in Brazil for Glory of Heroes 7. In the night’s action, Qiu Jianliang kept his winning streak alive against Wilson Djavan, winning by decision. He further beat Diego Freitas and Subsakorn, he appeared on the Krush and Glory of Heroes collaborated card - Krush.77‘Japan vs. China in Korakuen Hall Tokyo, Japan. Qiu Jianliang beat the former R.I.S.E. champion Komiya Yukihiro by unanimous decision.

This nine-fight winning streak earned him a place in the 2017 Glory of Heroes 65 kg tournament. In the tournament semifinals, Jianliang beat Aleksei Ulianov by unanimous decision. He beat Dylan Salvador in the same manner in the tournament finals.

Glory of Heroes title reign
On Jan 27, 2018 Glory of Heroes traveled to the Huandong Gymnasium in Qingdao, China, for Glory of Heroes 9. Jianliang defeated Yuichiro Nagashima by TKO in Round 3. On Saturday, May 26, 2018 Glory of Heroes held its 31st event in Beijing, China. Qiu Jianliang beat Kaew Weerasakreck by decision. At Glory of Heroes 33, Jianliang fought Issam Chadid. He extended his winning streak to 14, beating Chadid by unanimous decision.

At Glory of Heroes 38, Jianliang fought Dmitry Varats for the 2019 ISKA Junior Lightweight title. He won the fight by TKO, after Varats withdrew from the bout at the end of the second round.

After winning the ISKA Junior Welterweight title, Jianliang was scheduled to fight Ivan Avdeev at Glory of Heroes 41. He won the fight by unanimous decision. Jianliang was next scheduled to fight Ivan Naccari at Glory of Heroes 44, whom he beat by decision. Jianliang injured the ligaments of his right knee in the first round of the Naccari fight, which sidelined him for the entirety of 2020.

ONE Championship
It was announced on June 20, 2021, that Jianliang had signed with the ONE Championship, and would compete in the bantamweight kickboxing division of the promotion.

Jianliang made his ONE debut against Hiroki Akimoto at ONE: Winter Warriors on December 3, 2021. He lost the bout via unanimous decision.

Championships and awards 

Kickboxing
2019 ISKA Welterweight (-67 kg) Intercontinental Champion
2017 GOH Featherweight (-65kg) World Champion
2016 WLF World 8 Man Tournament champion -67 kg
2015 WLF World Championship Runner Up -67 kg
2014 WLF Men's intercontinental champion -65 kg
Muaythai
2015 S-1 Muaythai Welterweight World champion (1 Title Def.)
2014 S-1 Muaythai Welterweight World champion
Amateur Muay Thai
2013 Chinese Muay Thai Championship  -75 kg
2012 Chinese Muay Thai Championship  -71 kg
2011 Chinese Muay Thai Championship  -71 kg
Ranking
N°1 Combat Press.com at Featherweight, October, 2018
N°8 Combat Press.com at Pound-For-Pound, October, 2018
N°4 Liver Kick.com at Featherweight, March 12, 2018

Kickboxing record

|- style="background:#fbb;"
| 2021-12-03|| Loss ||align=left| Hiroki Akimoto || ONE: Winter Warriors || Kallang, Singapore || Decision (Unanimous) || 3 || 3:00
|- style="background:#cfc;"
| 2019-12-28 || Win||align=left| Ivan Naccari || Glory of Heroes 44|| China || Decision || 3 || 3:00
|- style="background:#cfc;"
| 2019-09-29 || Win||align=left| Ivan Avdeev || Glory of Heroes 41|| Qinhuangdao, China || Decision || 3 || 3:00
|- style="background:#cfc;"
| 2019-08-05 || Win||align=left| Ahmed Ismael || Glory of Heroes 40|| Egypt|| Ext.R Decision (Unanimous) || 4 || 3:00 
|-
|- style="background:#cfc;"
| 2019-05-25 || Win ||align=left| Dmitry Varats || Glory of Heroes 38: Shantou || Shantou, China || TKO (retirement)|| 2 || 3:00
|-
! style=background:white colspan=9 |Wins the 2019 ISKA Welterweight (-67 kg) Intercontinental title.
|-
|- style="background:#cfc;"
| 2018-07-28 || Win ||align=left| Issam Chadid || Glory of Heroes 33: Shanghai || Shanghai, China || Decision (Unanimous) || 3 || 3:00
|-
|- style="background:#cfc;"
| 2018-05-26 || Win ||align=left| Kaew Weerasakreck|| Glory of Heroes 31: Beijing || Beijing, China ||Decision (Unanimous) || 3 || 3:00
|-
|- style="background:#cfc;"
| 2018-01-27 || Win ||align=left| Yuichiro Nagashima|| Glory of Heroes: Qingdao || Qingdao, China || TKO (Punches) || 3 || 1:23 
|-
|-  style="background:#cfc;"
| 2017-12-23 || Win ||align=left| Dylan Salvador|| Glory of Heroes: Jinan - GOH 65 kg Championship Tournament, Finals || Jinan, China || Decision (Unanimous) || 3 || 3:00
|-
! style=background:white colspan=9 |Wins the 2017 GOH Featherweight (-65kg) World title.
|-  style="background:#cfc;"
| 2017-12-23 || Win ||align=left| Aleksei Ulianov || Glory of Heroes: Jinan - GOH 65 kg Championship Tournament, Semi-Finals || Jinan, China || Decision (Unanimous) || 3 || 3:00
|-
|-  style="background:#cfc;"
| 2017-07-16 || Win ||align=left| Komiya Yukihiro || Glory of Heroes: Japan & Krush.77  || Tokyo, Japan || Decision (Unanimous) || 3 || 3:00 
|-
|-  style="background:#cfc;"
| 2017-06-16 || Win ||align=left| Subsakorn || Glory of Heroes: Shangyu || Shangyu, China || KO (Spinning Heel Kick) || 2 || 
|-
|-  style="background:#cfc;"
| 2017-05-27 || Win ||align=left| Diego Freitas || Glory of Heroes: Portugal & Strikers League || Carcavelos, Portugal || Ext. R Decision  || 4 || 3:00 
|-
|-  style="background:#cfc;"
| 2017-03-04 || Win ||align=left| Wilson Djavan || Glory of Heroes 7 || Sao Paulo, Brazil || Decision (Unanimous) || 3 || 3:00 
|-
|-  style="background:#cfc;"
| 2017-01-13 || Win ||align=left| Kem Sitsongpeenong || Glory of Heroes 6 || Jiyuan, China || KO (Spinning Back Kick to the Body) || 1 || 2:19 
|-
|-  style="background:#cfc;"
| 2016-12-17 || Win ||align=left| Adrian Maxim || Glory of Heroes - Rise 5  || Nanning, China || Decision (Unanimous) || 3 || 3:00 
|-
|-  style="background:#cfc;"
| 2016-11-19 || Win || align=left| Sebastien Fleury || Rise of Heroes 4: Europe VS China || Martigny, Switzerland || KO (Right High Kick) || 1 || 2:26 
|-
! style=background:white colspan=9 |Wins the Martigny M.J.M -67 kg title.
|-  style="background:#cfc;"
| 2016-10-01 || Win || align=left| Ilias Bulaid || Glory of Heroes 5 || Zhengzhou, China || Decision (Unanimous) || 3 || 3:00 
|-
|-  style="background:#cfc;"
| 2016-09-17 || Win || align=left| Melvin Wassing || Rise of Heroes 1 || Chaoyang, Liaoning, China || Decision (Unanimous) || 3 || 3:00 
|-
|-  style="background:#fbb;"
| 2016-08-04 || Loss || align=left| Azize Hlali || Wu Lin Feng 2016: WFL x Fight League - China vs Morocco || Tangier, Morocco || Decision || 3 || 3:00 
|-
! style=background:white colspan=9 |For the Fight League World -67 kg title.
|-  style="background:#cfc;"
| 2016-07-02 || Win || align=left| Ruslan Kushnirenko || Glory of Heroes 3 || Jiyuan, China || TKO (Corner Stoppage) || 2 || 2:21 
|-
|-  style="background:#cfc;"
| 2016-05-07 || Win || align=left| Noppakrit Kor.Kampanart || Glory of Heroes 2 || Shenzhen, China || Decision (Unanimous) || 3 || 3:00 
|-
|-  style="background:#cfc;"
| 2016-04-02 || Win || align=left| Jomthong Chuwattana || Glory of Heroes 1 || Shenzhen, China || Ext. R Decision (Unanimous) || 4 || 3:00
|-
|-  style="background:#cfc;"
| 2016-01-23 || Win || align=left| Andrei Kulebin || Wu Lin Feng 2016: World Championship in Shanghai 8 Man Tournament, Final || Shanghai, China || KO (Right Hook) || 1 || 1:51
|-
! style=background:white colspan=9 |Wins the Wu Lin Feng World 8 Man -67kg Tournament.
|-  style="background:#cfc;"
| 2016-01-23 || Win || align=left| Lu Jianbo || Wu Lin Feng 2016: World Championship in Shanghai 8 Man Tournament, Semi Finals || Shanghai, China || TKO (Punches) || 1 || 2:16 
|-
|-  style="background:#cfc;"
| 2016-01-23 || Win || align=left| Nathan Robson || Wu Lin Feng 2016: World Championship in Shanghai 8 Man Tournament, Quarter Finals || Shanghai, China || Decision (Unanimous) || 3 || 3:00 
|-
|-  style="background:#cfc;"
| 2015-12-12 || Win || align=left| Montree Khongthongkam || Wu Lin Feng 2015 || Beijing, China || KO (Right Hook) || 2 || 2:48 
|-
|-  style="background:#cfc;"
| 2015-12-05 || Win || align="left" | Honghoen Por.niramon || Wu Lin Feng King's Cup 2015 Celebrating the King's Birthday || Bangkok, Thailand || KO || 3 ||
|-
! style=background:white colspan=9 |Retains the S1 Muaythai Welterweight World title.
|-  style="background:#cfc;"
| 2015-11-13 || Win || align=left| Shavone Warren || Wu Lin Feng & WCK Muaythai: China vs USA || Las Vegas, USA || Decision (Unanimous) || 3 || 3:00 
|-
|-  style="background:#cfc;"
| 2015-11-07 || Win || align=left| Mosab Amrani || Wu Lin Feng 2015 || Shenyang, China || TKO (Doctor Stoppage) || 2 || 0:00 
|-
|-  style="background:#cfc;"
| 2015-10-24 || Win || align=left| Bovy Sor Udomson || Wu Lin Feng 2015 || Hong Kong, China || KO (Left Head Knee) || 1 || 2:59 
|-
|-  style="background:#cfc;"
| 2015-10-03 || Win || align=left| Alessio Dangelo || Wu Lin Feng 2015 || Zhengzhou, China || TKO (Low Kick) || 1 ||
|-
|-  style="background:#cfc;"
| 2015-09-19 || Win || align=left| Kane Conlan || Wu Lin Feng 2015 || Oakland, New Zealand || Decision (Unanimous) || 3 || 3:00 
|-
|-  style="background:#cfc;"
| 2015-08-08 || Win || align=left| Andrei Khamionak || Wu Lin Feng 2015 || Xian, China || Decision (Unanimous) || 3 || 3:00 
|-
|-  style="background:#fbb;"
| 2015-07-04 || Loss || align=left| Yang Zhuo || Wu Lin Feng World Championship 2015 – 67 kg Tournament, Final || Zhengzhou, China || Decision (Unanimous) || 3 || 3:00 
|-
! style=background:white colspan=9 |For the Wu Lin Feng 2015 World Championship -67 kg title.
|-  style="background:#cfc;"
| 2015-07-04 || Win || align=left| Andrei Kulebin || Wu Lin Feng World Championship 2015 – 67 kg Tournament, Semi Final || Zhengzhou, China || Decision (Unanimous) || 3 || 3:00 
|-
|-  style="background:#cfc;"
| 2015-06-21 || Win || align=left| Kim Dongsu || Wu Lin Feng 2015 || Chengdu, China || Ext. R Decision (Unanimous) || 4 || 3:00 
|-
|-  style="background:#cfc;"
| 2015-06-06 || Win || align=left| Kim Robin Leinz || Wu Lin Feng World Championship 2015 – 67 kg Tournament, Reserve Fight || Zhengzhou, China || KO (Spinning Heel Kick) || 3 || 1:13 
|-
|-
|-  style="background:#fbb;"
| 2015-03-07 || Loss || align=left| Jomthong Chuwattana || Wu Lin Feng World Championship 2015 – 67 kg Tournament, Quarter Finals || Zhengzhou, China || Decision || 3 || 3:00 
|-
|-  style="background:#cfc;"
| 2015-03-07 || Win || align=left| Antonio Campagna || Wu Lin Feng World Championship 2015 – 67 kg Tournament, Open || Zhengzhou, China || Decision (Unanimous) || 3 || 3:00 
|-
|-  style="background:#cfc;"
| 2015-01-31 || Win || align=left| Bovy Sor Udomson || Wu Lin Feng 2014 World Kickboxing Championship || Chongqing, China || Decision (Unanimous) || 3 || 3:00 
|-
|-  style="background:#cfc;"
| 2014-12-31 || Win || align=left| Oumoke || Wu Lin Feng 2014 || Yi'ning, China || Decision (Unanimous) || 3 || 3:00 
|-
|-  style="background:#fbb;"
| 2014-11-01 || Loss || align=left| Melsik Baghdasaryan || Wu Lin Feng & WCK Muaythai: China vs USA || Las Vegas, USA || Decision (Majority) || 3 || 3:00 
|-
! style=background:white colspan=9 |For the Wu Lin Feng International -67 kg title.
|-  style="background:#cfc;"
| 2014-10-04 || Win || align=left| Manshbeko Tolipov || Wu Lin Feng 2014 || Wenling, China  || KO (Punches) || 2 || 1:35 
|-
|-  style="background:#cfc;"
| 2014-09-21 || Win || align=left| Atsushi Ogata || Peng Cheng Jue: China vs Japan || Shenzhen, China || KO || 2 ||
|- 
|-  style="background:#cfc;"
| 2014-09-07 || Win || align=left| Rafael Silvalet || Wu Lin Feng 2014 || Karamay, China || TKO (Corner Stoppage) || 2 || 1:10 
|-
|-  style="background:#cfc;"
| 2014-08-12 || Win || align=left| Superball Sor Borisu || Wu Lin Feng & Thailand Queen’s Cup 2014 || Bangkok, Thailand || TKO (Referee Stoppage) || 3 || 2:40 
|-
! style=background:white colspan=9 |Wins the S1 Muaythai Welterweight World title. 
|-  style="background:#cfc;"
| 2014-07-18 || Win || align=left| Phosa Nopphorn || Wu Lin Feng 2014 || Dingyuan, China || TKO (Low Kick) || 2 || 1:50 
|-
|-  style="background:#fbb;"
| 2014-06-14 || Loss || align=left| Frans Mlambo || Wu Lin Feng 2014 || Dublin, Ireland || Decision (Unanimous) || 3 || 3:00 
|- 
|-  style="background:#cfc;"
| 2014-05-24 || Win || align=left| Imwiset Pornnarai || Wu Lin Feng & Yokkao 9  || Xinyang, China || Decision (Unanimous) || 3 || 3:00 
|- 
|-  style="background:#cfc;"
| 2014-04-27 || Win || align=left| Wang Pengfei || Wu Lin Feng World Championship 2014 – 67 kg Tournament, Final || Luohe, China || Decision (Unanimous) || 3 || 3:00 
|- 
! style=background:white colspan=9 |Wins the Wu Lin Feng International -65 kg title.
|-  style="background:#cfc;"
| 2014-04-27 || Win || align=left| Ediey Selendang Kuning || Wu Lin Feng World Championship 2014 – 67 kg Tournament, Semi Finals || Luohe, China || KO (Left Hook to the Body) || 1 || 1:20 
|-
|-  style="background:#cfc;"
| 2014-04-14 || Win ||align=left| Behzad Rafigh Doust ||  Combat Banchamek || Surin, Thailand || Decision || 3 || 3:00 
|- 
|-  style="background:#cfc;"
| 2014-03-07 || Win || align=left| James || Wu Lin Feng 2014 || Hangzhou, China || KO (Right Spinning Back Kick to the Body) || 1 || 2:11 
|-
|-  style="background:#cfc;"
| 2014-02-16 || Win || align=left| Sagetdao Petpayathai || Wu Lin Feng & Kunlun Fight 2 & MAX Muay Thai 6 || Zhengzhou, China || TKO (Referee Stoppage) || 3 || 2:57 
|-
|-  style="background:#fbb;"
| 2014-01-18 || Loss || align=left| Phosa Nopphorn || Wu Lin Feng 2013 World Kickboxing Championship || Zhengzhou, China || Decision (Unanimous) || 3 || 3:00 
|-
|-  style="background:#cfc;"
| 2013-12-27 || Win || align=left| Songchai || Wu Lin Feng 2013 || Changji, China || KO ||  ||
|-
|-  style="background:#cfc;"
| 2013-01-26 || Win || align=left| Wisrichai || 2013 China vs Thailand Muay Thai tournament || Zhengzhou, China || KO (Elbow) || 2 ||
|- 
|-
| colspan=9 | Legend:

Mixed martial arts record

|-
| Loss
| align=center| 0–1
| Kenneth Evensen
| Submission (Heel Hook)
| Glory of Heroes 36: Ziyang
| 
| align=center| 1
| align=center| 3:45
| Sichuan, China
|

Professional boxing record

Amateur Muay Thai record

|-	
|-  style="background:#cfc;"
| 2013-04-28 || Win ||align=left| Luo Can || National Muaythai Competition 2013 & World Kungfu GF League Tryout, Final -75 kg || Wenchang, China || TKO (Referee Stoppage) || 1 || 
|- 	
! style=background:white colspan=9 |Wins the Chinese Muay Thai Championship Gold Medal  -75 kg.  	
|-  style="background:#cfc;"
| 2013-04-28 || Win ||align=left| Geng Haojun || National Muaythai Competition 2013 & World Kungfu GF League Tryout, Semi Finals -75 kg || Wenchang, China || Decision (Unanimous) || 3 || 2:00 	
|- 	
|-  style="background:#cfc;"
| 2013-04-27 || Win ||align=left| Lu Xiangwei || National Muaythai Competition 2013 & World Kungfu GF League Tryout, Quarter Finals -75 kg || Wenchang, China || Decision (Unanimous) || 3 || 2:00 	
|- 	
|-  style="background:#cfc;"
| 2013-04-26 || Win ||align=left| Huang Zhenyou || National Muaythai Competition 2013 & World Kungfu GF League Tryout, Eighth Finals -75 kg || Wenchang, China || Decision (Unanimous) || 3 || 2:00 	
|- 
|-  style="background:#cfc;"
| 2012-06-23 || Win ||align=left| Li Mu || National Muaythai Competition 2012 & World Kungfu GF League Tryout, Semi Finals -71 kg || Jingmen, China || KO || 1 ||  	
|- 
! style=background:white colspan=9 |Wins the Chinese Muay Thai Championship Bronze Medal -71 kg.
|-  style="background:#fbb;"
| 2012-06-22 || Loss ||align=left| Zhao Feilong || National Muaythai Competition 2012 & World Kungfu GF League Tryout, Semi Finals -71 kg || Jingmen, China || Decision (Unanimous) || 4 || 2:00 	
|- 	
|-  style="background:#cfc;"
| 2012-06-22 || Win ||align=left| Xie Lei || National Muaythai Competition 2012 & World Kungfu GF League Tryout, Quarter Finals -71 kg || Jingmen, China || Decision (Unanimous) || 4 || 2:00 	
|- 
|-  style="background:#cfc;"
| 2012-06-21 || Win ||align=left| Wu Xuesong || National Muaythai Competition 2012 & World Kungfu GF League Tryout, Eighth Finals -71 kg || Jingmen, China || Decision (Unanimous) || 4 || 2:00 
|-	
|-  style="background:#fbb;"
| 2011-07-30 || Loss ||align=left| Zhang Lei || National Muaythai Competition 2011 & World Kungfu GF League Tryout, Final -71 kg || Foshan, China || TKO (Corner Stoppage) || 1 ||
|- 
! style=background:white colspan=9 |Wins the Chinese Muay Thai Championship Silver Medal -71 kg. 
|-  style="background:#cfc;"
| 2011-07-30 || Win ||align=left| Aihemaitijiang Duolikun || National Muaythai Competition 2011 & World Kungfu GF League Tryout, Semi Finals -71 kg || Foshan, China || Decision (Unanimous) || 4 || 2:00 
|-
|-  style="background:#cfc;"
| 2011-07-29 || Win ||align=left| Lv Yalun || National Muaythai Competition 2011 & World Kungfu GF League Tryout,  Quarter Finals -71 kg || Foshan, China || TKO (Referee Stoppage) || 3 ||
|-
|-  style="background:#cfc;"
| 2011-07-28 || Win ||align=left| Xiao Kaifei || National Muaythai Competition 2011 & World Kungfu GF League Tryout, Eighth Finals -71 kg || Foshan, China || TKO (Referee Stoppage) || 3 ||  	
|- 
|-
| colspan=9 | Legend:

External links
 Official Krush profile

References 

Chinese male kickboxers
Welterweight kickboxers
Middleweight kickboxers
Featherweight kickboxers
ONE Championship kickboxers
1990 births
Living people
Chinese male mixed martial artists
Mixed martial artists utilizing sanshou
Mixed martial artists utilizing Muay Thai
Mixed martial artists utilizing boxing
Chinese sanshou practitioners
Sportspeople from Anhui
Chinese Muay Thai practitioners
People from Fengyang